Ralph Edward Haines Jr. (August 21, 1913 – November 23, 2011) was a United States Army four-star general who served as Vice Chief of Staff of the United States Army from 1967 to 1968, Commander, United States Army, Pacific from August 1968 to October 1970, and Commanding General, United States Continental Army Command from 1970 to 1973. At his death he was the army's oldest living four-star general and its senior retired officer.

Military career
Haines attended Texas Military Institute and graduated in 1930 as his class valedictorian. He graduated from the United States Military Academy in 1935 with a commission in the Cavalry. He later attended the Armed Forces Staff College, the Army War College, the National War College and the Army Management School. Prior to World War II he served in the Philippine Scouts and, during the war, he served in Italy.

Haines served as Commanding General of the 1st Armored Division at Fort Hood, Texas, from 1962 to 1963. He served as Deputy Assistant Chief of Staff for Force Development in Washington from 1963 to 1965. From 1965 to 1967, he commanded the III Corps. He was successively Acting Vice Chief of Staff and then Vice Chief of Staff for the United States Army and during this period he commanded the army forces assisting the suppression of the 1968 Washington, D.C. riots. He then served as Commanding General, Continental Army Command, at Fort Monroe, Virginia, until his retirement on January 31, 1973.

Haines' awards include the Army Distinguished Service Medal, the Legion of Merit, and the Bronze Star Medal.

Post military career
The Ralph E. Haines Jr. Award, presented to the United States Army Reserve Drill Sergeant of the Year, is named in his honor. Haines was member of the Advisory Committee of the U.S. Cavalry Association. He retired to San Antonio, Texas, with his wife, the former Sally Swift, who died in 2003. Haines had two sons, both West Point alumni. One son, Palmer Swift Haines, died in an aircraft crash in 2004 when the Cessna 421 he was piloting suffered dual engine failure near Austin, Texas.

Haines died in November 2011 at the San Antonio Military Medical Center of natural causes.

References

External links
 

1913 births
2011 deaths
United States Army personnel of World War II
Burials at Fort Sam Houston National Cemetery
Recipients of the Distinguished Service Medal (US Army)
Recipients of the Legion of Merit
United States Army generals
United States Army Vice Chiefs of Staff
United States Army War College alumni
United States Military Academy alumni
TMI Episcopal alumni
Joint Forces Staff College alumni
National War College alumni